The Qatar Handball League is a professional handball league in Qatar. It was founded in 1981.

Champions
Champions so far are:

Performances

Performance by club

See also
List of handball clubs in Qatar

References

Handball in Qatar
Sports leagues in Qatar
Qatar